Phaulopsis imbricata is a shrub native to South Africa. It is also known as Himalayan ruellia. Leaves are opposite, one larger than the other in each pair, usually asymmetrical at the base. Phaulopsis imbricata is a good fodder, the young leaves are eaten as a vegetable and the plant-ash in oil is rubbed into scarifications on the back for rheumatism in Tanganyika. The flowers have an unpleasant smell. It is filed as near-threatened by the IUCN. It is one of the larval host plants of the butterflies great eggfly, tiny grass blue, brown pansy, soldier pansy and marbled elf.

References

External links

 Where seen
 Photos
 

Acanthaceae